Barsinghausen is a town in the district of Hanover, in Lower Saxony, Germany. It is situated at the Deister chain of hills approx. 20 km west of Hanover. Barsinghausen belongs to the historic landscape Calenberg Land and was first mentioned in 1193.

Geography

Neighbouring places
Barsinghausen adjoins Wunstorf, Seelze, Gehrden, Springe, Bad Nenndorf and Wennigsen.

Division of the town
Barsinghausen consists of 18 districts:
Bantorf, Barrigsen, Barsinghausen, Eckerde, Egestorf, Göxe, Großgoltern, Nordgoltern, Groß Munzel, Hohenbostel, Holtensen, Kirchdorf, Landringhausen, Langreder, Ostermunzel, Stemmen, Wichtringhausen, Winninghausen

History
Barsinghausen is the site of an old double monastery (“Kloster Barsinghausen”) that was established during the High Middle Ages. At that time, fertile loess soil and a number of influent streams to river Südaue constituted a central fundament for farming and numerous windmills in Calenberg Land. Barsinghausen became a coal mining town between 1871 and 1957. After World War II, other sectors of industry began to dominate Barsinghausen's economy.

Population development
(each time at 31 December)
 1998 – 34,743
 1999 – 34,648
 2000 – 34,497
 2001 – 34,408
 2002 – 34,370
 2003 – 34,376
 2004 – 34,253

Sights
Barsinghausen is home to "Kloster Barsinghausen", a nunnery first mentioned in 1193 (now a Lutheran women's convent, to Monastery Church St. Mary ("Marienkirche"), to the Deister Open Air Theater (“Deister Freilichtbühne”), to the exhibition mine “Klosterstollen”, to Sport Hotel Fuchsbachtal and to Lower Saxony's Soccer Association. The Colossus of Ostermunzel is a glacial erratic qualified as a natural monument. Its large size is abnormal, particularly for northern Germany and especially for Lower Saxony.

Education

Elementary schools
 Adolf-Grimme-Schule
 Wilhelm-Stedler-Schule
 Ernst-Reuter-Schule
 Astrid-Lindgren-Schule
 Albert-Schweitzer-Schule
 Grundschule Groß Munzel
 Grundschule Hohenbostel
 Grundschule Bantorf

Secondary schools
 Hannah-Arendt-Gymnasium
 Lisa-Tetzner-Schule
 Goetheschule KGS Barsinghausen

Special schools
 Bert-Brecht-Schule (Special education school)
 VHS (Volkshochschule – Adult high school) Calenberger Land

Twin towns – sister cities

Barsinghausen is twinned with:
 Brzeg Dolny, Poland
 Kovel, Ukraine
 Mont-Saint-Aignan, France
 Wurzen, Germany

Notable people
 Hartmut Andryczuk, publisher
 Fritz Brase (1875–1940), military musician and composer
 Herbert Lattmann (born 1944), former member of the Bundestag (CDU)
 Kurt Sohns (1907–1990), painter, artist, professor at the Technical University of Hanover

Associated with the town
 Heinz Erhardt (1909–1979), actor and comedian, attended from 1919 to 1924 a boarding school in Barsinghausen
 Herbert Gruhl (1921–1993), politician and author (Ein Planet wird geplündert, 1975)
 Hans-Joachim Mack (1928–2008), General of the Bundeswehr
 Robert Schulz (1900–1974), SS brigade leader in Nazism, member of the Reichstag, lived and worked after 1945 as a civil servant in Barsinghausen
 Colonel Ernst Poten (1785–1838), prominent cavalry leader (1808–1815) in the King's German Legion in Portugal, Spain, France and at Waterloo and later in the Hanoverian Army.
 August Heinrich Walter Münstermann (1931–2007), founder of Pelikan Company in Mexico. Writer and Journalist of Wochenblatt in the region of Schaumburg, Niedersachsen.

References

External links

  

Towns in Lower Saxony
Hanover Region